Mengarini may refer to:

 Gregorio Mengarini (1811-1886), Italian Jesuit priest and missionary and linguist
  (1856-1927), Italian engineer and politician
 Mengarini's Opening, a chess opening devised by American chess master Ariel Mengarini which is a variant of the Sicilian Game
 Palazzo Mengarini, a 19th-century palazzo in Rome

See also
 

Surnames of Italian origin